This article provides two lists:
A list of National Basketball Association players by total career regular season leaders in minutes played.
A progressive list of leaders, and records for minutes played showing how the record has increased through the years.

Minutes played leaders
This is a list of National Basketball Association players by total career regular season leaders in minutes played.
Statistics accurate as of March 16, 2023.

Progressive list of minutes played leaders
This is a progressive list of leaders and records for minutes played showing how the record has increased through the years.
Statistics accurate as of March 16, 2023.

See also

Notes

References

External links
Basketball-Reference.com enumeration of NBA career leaders in minutes played
National Basketball Association official website enumeration of NBA career leaders in minutes played

National Basketball Association lists
National Basketball Association statistical leaders